Pallavaram (Tamil: பல்லாவரம்), is a major place in Chennai, Tamil Nadu.

Pallavaram may also refer to:
 Pallavaram taluk, a taluk.
 Pallavaram Lake, a lake.
 Pallavaram railway station, a railway station.
 Pallavaram (state assembly constituency), a state assembly constituency.
 Pallavaram Friday Market, a shopping market.
 Pallavaram Flyover, a bridge.